There are at least 60 named mountains in Fergus County, Montana.
 Bald Butte, el. 
 Bald Butte, el. 
 Bald Butte, el. 
 Bald Butte, el. 
 Big Grassy Peak, el. 
 Black Butte, el. 
 Black Butte, el. 
 Bloomfield Butte, el. 
 Burnette Peak, el. 
 Button Butte, el. 
 Button Butte, el. 
 Castle Butte, el. 
 Cherry Top, el. 
 Clagget Hill, el. 
 Coal Hill, el. 
 Collar Peak, el. 
 Cone Butte, el. 
 Crystal Peak, el. 
 Elk Peak, el. 
 Flat Mountain, el. 
 Gold Hill, el. 
 Greathouse Peak, el. 
 Haystack Butte, el. 
 Indian Butte, el. 
 Indian Graves Butte, el. 
 Judith Peak, el. 
 Jump Off Peak, el. 
 Kelly Hill, el. 
 Lewis Peak, el. 
 Lime Cave Peak, el. 
 Lookout Peak, el. 
 Lyons Butte, el. 
 Maginnis Mountain, el. 
 Maiden Peak, el. 
 McDonald Butte, el. 
 Mount Harlow, el. 
 New Year Peak, el. 
 Oil Well Hill, el. 
 Old Baldy, el. 
 Peck Hills, el. 
 Pekay Peak, el. 
 Porphyry Peak, el. 
 Pyramid Peak, el. 
 Rattlesnake Butte, el. 
 Red Mountain, el. 
 Reed Hill, el. 
 Reppe Butte, el. 
 Rocky Butte, el. 
 Sand Rock Hill, el. 
 Seventynine Hill, el. 
 Seventytwo Hills, el. 
 Sheep Mountain, el. 
 Sheepherder Peak, el. 
 Smoky Johnson Hill, el. 
 The Peak, el. 
 Three Buttes, el. 
 Twin Buttes, el. 
 West Peak, el. 
 White Horse Butte, el. 
 Woodhawk Hill, el.

See also
 List of mountains in Montana
 List of mountain ranges in Montana

Notes

Fergus